Vıləşə is a village in the municipality of Rinə in the Astara Rayon of Azerbaijan.

References

Populated places in Astara District